Mosallamiyeh (also Romanized as Mosallamīyeh; also known as Salmiāh, Shammeh, and Shanīmeh) is a village in Gheyzaniyeh Rural District, in the Central District of Ahvaz County, Khuzestan Province, Iran. At the 2006 census, its population was 145, in 26 families.

References 

Populated places in Ahvaz County